Liliane Schnitzler is a French dermatologist who described the eponymous Schnitzler's syndrome in 1972. Schnitzler's syndrome is a rare autoinflammatory disorder. The disorder was first called Schnitzler's syndrome in 1989.

Schniztler was born on May 20, 1938. She worked closely with Robert Degos, another French dermatologist. Schnitzler was also a professor, teaching at the CHU Angers, a university hospital in Angers. She became the head of its dermatology department in 1970. She was the first woman to be an associate professor of dermatology at CHU Angers. Schnitzler had retired by 2013.

Selected publications
 
  (First description of Schnitzler's syndrome)

References

French dermatologists
1938 births
People from Angers
20th-century women physicians
21st-century women physicians
French women academics